Allomyrina is a genus of rhinoceros beetle.

Species
Allomyrina davidis (Deyrolle & Fairmaire, 1878)
Allomyrina dichotoma (Linnaeus, 1771)
Allomyrina kanamorii Nagai, 2006
Allomyrina pfeifferi (Redtenbacher, 1867)

References

Dynastinae
Scarabaeidae genera